A Mouthful of Sky is an Indian television series which aired in 1995 on DD National. It was the first serial in English to be produced in India. Aired on DD National and based on the script by Ashok Banker, the serial deals with the lives, loves, ideals and aspirations of the post-independence generation of Indians, people in their mid-thirties who straddle the twin worlds of conventional Indian society as well as the urban westernized ethos.

Plot
The basic story is about five MBAs who reunite 13 years after graduation to confront a macabre secret from the past which a group of ruthless enemies use to try to destroy them. Woven into this crime-thriller structure are sub-plots dealing with urban Indians from various communities and their struggle to mix the inherent contradictions of their Indianness with their westernized outlook and language.

Cast 
 Rahul Bose as Sarkar / Pavan
 Kruttika Desai as Anita
 Milind Soman as Akash Bhandarkar 
 Samir Soni as Ashok Mathur
 Neesha Singh
 Shiuli Subaya
 Divya Seth 
 Mukul Dev as piyush raheja
 Shivaji Satam
 Ayesha Dharker
 Simone Singh as Madhulika
 Soni Razdan
 R. Madhavan
 Ranjeev Mulchandani as Prithvi Raheja  
 Kushal Punjabi

References

External links
 

Indian television soap operas
DD National original programming
1995 Indian television series debuts
English-language television shows
Indian drama television series